Petrophile shuttleworthiana  is a flowering plant in the family Proteaceae and is endemic to the south-west of Western Australia.

Description
They are terminal (appearing at the end of stems) and appear in spring.

Taxonomy and naming
The species was first formally described by Swiss botanist Carl Meissner in 1856 from a specimen collected in 1844 near the Swan River by James Drummond. The specific epithet recognises the English collector, botanist and malacologist Robert J. Shuttleworth. The closest relative of P. shuttleworthiana is Petrophile macrostachya.

Distribution and habitat
Petrophile shuttleworthiana is found in the Avon Wheatbelt, Geraldton Sandplains and Swan Coastal Plain biogeographic regions from Moore River north to Kalbarri. It grows in heath, shrubland or mallee on grey-yellow sand, sometimes with gravel or laterite.

Use in horticulture
Although its leaves and fruit are potential horticultural features, P. shuttleworthiana has not been seen in regular cultivation.

References

shuttleworthiana
Endemic flora of Western Australia
Eudicots of Western Australia
Plants described in 1856
Taxa named by Carl Meissner